Socialized Hate is the debut album from Arizona thrash metal band, Atrophy. It was released on Roadrunner Records in 1988 and followed two successful demo cassettes produced by the band the previous year. It was followed up two years later by the band's second and final album to date, Violent By Nature (1990). The album was co-produced by prolific producer/engineer, Bill Metoyer, who became famous for his work on early Slayer albums and went on to produce many heavy metal albums released in the 1980s and 1990s, mainly on Metal Blade Records.

Track listing
"Chemical Dependency" (Atrophy) – 4:04
"Killing Machine" (James Gulotta, Brian Zimmerman, Chris Lykins) – 3:43
"Matter of Attitude" (Lykins) – 3:25
"Preacher, Preacher" (Gulotta, Lykins, Zimmerman) – 4:15
"Beer Bong" (Lykins, Lehman) – 2:01
"Socialized Hate" (Atrophy) – 5:01
"Best Defense" (Lykins, Gulotta) – 3:46
"Product of the Past" (Lykins) – 3:48
"Rest in Pieces" (Lykins, Zimmerman) – 4:39
"Urban Decay" (Lykins) – 3:29

Credits
 Brian Zimmerman – vocals
 Chris Lykins – guitar
 Rick Skowron – guitar
 James Gulotta – bass
 Tim Kelly – drums
 Recorded at Music Grinder and EQ Sound Studios, Hollywood, and Pacific Studio, Chatsworth, California, USA
 Produced by Bill Metoyer and Atrophy
 Engineered and mixed by Bill Metoyer
 Mixed at Track Records, North Hollywood, USA
 Cover art by Brian Anderson

1988 debut albums
Atrophy (band) albums